Brian Bergen (born July 8, 1979) is an American Republican Party politician who has represented the 25th district in the New Jersey General Assembly since taking office on January 14, 2020.

Early life and education
Bergen is from Denville, where he served on the township council.

Bergen was a member of the cross country running team at James Caldwell High School in West Caldwell, which led to interest to join the team at the United States Military Academy. After attending West Point, Bergen served from 1997 to 2008 in the United States Army as a Boeing AH-64 Apache attack helicopter pilot and earned graduate degrees from the University of Phoenix and Rutgers University.

New Jersey General Assembly
Bergen jumped into the race for Assembly after incumbent Republican Michael Patrick Carroll announced that he would run for Morris County Surrogate. In the June 2019 Republican primary, Bergen and Anthony M. Bucco won the nomination for the two Assembly seats in the 25th district. After the death of state senator Anthony R. Bucco in September 2019, his son was appointed to fill the senate seat and Aura K. Dunn was appointed to fill the vacant Assembly seat.

In the November 2021 general election, Bergen and his Republican running mate Aura K. Dunn defeated Democratic Party challengers Lauren Barnett and Patricia Veres.

Committee assignments 
Committee assignments for the current session are:
Appropriations

District 25 
Each of the 40 districts in the New Jersey Legislature has one representative in the New Jersey Senate and two members in the New Jersey General Assembly. The representatives from the 25th District for the 2022—23 Legislative Session are:
 Senator Anthony M. Bucco (R)
 Assemblyman Brian Bergen (R)
 Assemblyman Aura K. Dunn (R)

References

External links
Legislative webpage

Living people
James Caldwell High School alumni
People from Denville, New Jersey
New Jersey city council members
Politicians from Mercer County, New Jersey
Republican Party members of the New Jersey General Assembly
Rutgers University alumni
United States Army officers
United States Military Academy alumni
University of Phoenix alumni
21st-century American politicians
1979 births
Military personnel from New Jersey